Kris Lefcoe is a film director and writer based in New York City. She graduated from the University of Toronto with a degree in philosophy, before attending Norman Jewison's Canadian Film Centre as a Director Resident.  Many of Lefcoe's films are dark comedies about contemporary culture.

Kris wrote, directed and produced the comedy pilot Giving Up, which won a number of awards including Overall Best of the Fest, and Best Writing, at the 2017 New York Television Festival, and Best Comedy and Best Director at Seriesfest. The series is executive produced by David Wain (Wet Hot American Summer).

Lefcoe's feature film Public Domain, starring Don McKellar, Nicole DeBoer (Private Eyes, The Dead Zone) and Jason Jones (The Daily Show, The Detour), premiered at South by Southwest film festival and won the Audience Award for Best Feature at the Beverly Hills Film Festival. The film was installed in a curated program of video art at Art Basel Miami.

Lefcoe wrote and directed a number of notable short films, including Tiny Riot Project, which screened at Rotterdam Film Festival, was installed at Havana Biennale and Art Basel Miami, and sold to The Sundance Channel, and Can I Get a Witness?, starring Scott Speedman, which premiered at Toronto International Film Festival.

Kris Lefcoe has directed numerous music videos, including Peaches Boys Wanna Be Her. Her work has been nominated Best New Artist MVA and winner of Best Music Video at Ottawa International Animation Festival.

References

McSorley, Tom. "Short Takes - Can I Get a Witness?" Take One, Autumn, 1996 
Ingman, Marritt. "Reality Really, Really Bites: Kris Lefcoe and Public Domain," Austin Chronicle, March 19, 2004 
Braun, Liz. "Candid Camera: Public Domain Scornfully Peers Through the Lens of Reality TV" Toronto SUN, May 14, 2004 (fee for full article) 
Anderson, Jason. "On Screen: It's All Ogre Now," Eye Weekly, May 13, 2004.[www.eye.net/eye/issue/issue_05.13.04/film/onscreen.php]
Aronofsky, Rory. "Reviews: Public Domain" Film Threat, March 18, 2004.
Telefilm Canada

External links

Living people
Canadian Film Centre alumni
Year of birth missing (living people)